Assinica Lake is a fresh water body on the hydrographic slope of the Assinica River and Broadback Rivers, flowing into the Municipality of Eeyou Istchee Bay- James (municipality), in the administrative region of Nord-du-Québec, in Quebec, Canada.

Lake Opataca is part of a group of lakes at the head of the Assinica River. Forestry is the main economic activity of the sector. Recreational tourism activities come second.

The surface of Opataca Lake is usually frozen from early November to mid-May, however, safe ice circulation is generally mid-November to mid-April.

Geography

Toponymy
The term "Assinica" has been assigned by the Commission de toponymie du Québec to the lake, the river and the Wildlife Reserve.

Of Cree origin, the term "Assinica" derives from the term "Asinikaw", whose roots are "asini, pierre and kaw" (verbal suffix equivalent to the verb "to be" in French), meaning "filled with stones".

The old map documents indicate that prior to 1932 the term applied to a set of lakes on the same hydrographic slope. Today, Assinica now only refers to the most westerly hydrographic entity. The spelling of the place name Assinica has long been spelled "Assinika".

Covering an area of 8,885 km², the Assinica Wildlife Refuge encircles the lake.

The toponym lac Assinica was formalized on December 5, 1968, at the Commission de toponymie du Québec.

Notes and references

See also 

Eeyou Istchee James Bay
Lakes of Nord-du-Québec
LAssinica